Dame Margaret Miles, DBE (11 July 1911 – 26 April 1994) was a British educationist.

She served as Headmistress of Pate's Grammar School, Cheltenham between 1946 and 1952. Then, going on to be Headmistress of Mayfield School, Putney between 1952 and 1973. 

A strong believer in equal education for all, she served as President of the Campaign for Comprehensive Education between 1979 and 1994. She studied at Bedford College, London (now Royal Holloway, University of London), later also receiving an honorary doctorate of the University of London.  

She was appointed Dame Commander of the Most Excellent Order of the British Empire in 1970.

References

1911 births
1994 deaths
Comprehensive education
Dames Commander of the Order of the British Empire
Heads of schools in England
Women heads of schools in the United Kingdom